Tanonaka (written: 田野中) is a Japanese surname. Notable people with the surname include:

, Japanese voice actor
Dalton Tanonaka (born 1954), American television executive
, Japanese hurdler

Japanese-language surnames